The 2019 Toronto Defiant season was the first season of Toronto Defiant's existence in the Overwatch League as one of eight expansion franchises added for the 2019 season. After posting a 5–2 record in Stage 1, the Defiant qualified for the Stage 1 Playoffs, but a 0–3 loss against the Shock eliminated the team in the quarterfinals. The team failed to recreate the success they found in Stage 1 in the following stages, going 2–5, 0–7, and 1–6 in Stages 2, 3, and 4, respectively. A 2–3 loss to the Fusion on August 4 officially eliminated Toronto from postseason contention, and three days later, the team released head coach Lee "Bishop" Beom-joon. Despite numerous roster changes throughout the season, the Defiant finished the season in 17th place overall with an 8–20 record.

Preceding offseason 

Toronto announced their initial inaugural season roster over a span from October 27 to November 27; the team's roster consisted of the following players:
Lee "envy" Kang-Jae,
Park "Neko" Se-hyeon,
Lee "ivy" Seung-hyun,
Lee "Stellar" Do-hyung,
Jo "Yakpung" Gyeong-mu,
Ko "Aid" Jae-yoon,
Choi "Asher" Jun-sung, and
Park "RoKy" Joo-seong.

Regular season 
The Defiant opened their 2019 season with a match against the Houston Outlaws on February 15; Toronto won the match 3–2. Toronto finished Stage 1 with a 5–2 record and secured a Stage 1 Playoff berth. At the end of Stage 1, the Defiant were tied with the Philadelphia Fusion for the third seed of the Stage 1 Playoffs. By rule, the teams would have to compete in an offline match to determine seeding; however, both teams agreed on a coin-flip, instead. The Defiant received the third seed and faced sixth-seeded San Francisco Shock in the quarterfinals on March 22. The Defiant lost the series 0–3.

A few days prior to the beginning of Stage 2, Toronto Defiant parted ways with their strategic coach Kim "Don" Dong-wook. A day later, DPS player Lee "Stellar" Do-hyung retired from professional Overwatch for personal reasons. To take his place, Defiant signed Jin "im37" Hong, who had been playing Overwatch professionally for only just over a month, hours before the beginning of Stage 2. In Stage 2, Toronto faced the undefeated Vancouver Titans on May 3. The Defiant lost the series 1–3, putting the team on a five-game losing streak. The loss also officially eliminated them from Stage 2 Playoff contention. The team's final match of Stage 2 was against the Paris Eternal. Toronto went on to win, 4–0, marking their first sweep of the season.

There were more roster changes for Toronto heading into Stage 3. Both tank Daniel "Gods" Graeser and tank Normunds "sharyk" Faterins were moved up from the Defiant's academy team Montreal Rebellion in mid-May. The Defiant also had another roster member leave, as Choi "Asher" Joon-seong retired from competitive Overwatch on May 29. In the middle of Stage 3, Toronto transferred off-tank Lee "envy" Kang-jae, who had not played in a match since Stage 2, to the Shanghai Dragons on June 18. More roster transactions took place the following week, as the team promoted veteran DPS Andreas "Logix" Berghmans from the Montreal Rebellion and signed DPS Liam "Mangachu" Campbell, who had played for Team Canada in the 2017 and 2018 Overwatch World Cup. Toronto performed poorly throughout the stage, losing all seven of their matches.

Toronto snapped their nine-game losing streak on August 1, after defeating the Stage 3 Champions Shanghai Dragons, 2–1. The Defiant faced the Philadelphia Fusion three days later, but the team was unable to scrim prior to the match due to an upper-management decision to send Daniel "Gods" Graeser and Go "Aid" Jae-yoon to a media event in Toronto. Toronto lost the match against Philadelphia by a score of 2–3; the loss officially eliminated the Defiant from postseason contention. Following the loss, on August 7, the Defiant released head coach Lee "Bishop" Beom-joon and announced that assistant coach Matthew "Optidox" Sims, assistant coach Shim "Mobydik" Seung-bo, and analyst Dennis "Barroi" Matz would be taking on the role of head coaches by committee for the remainder of the season. Toronto finished the season in 17th place with a 8–20 record.

Final roster

Transactions 
Transactions of/for players on the roster during the 2019 regular season:
On April 3, Lee "Stellar" Do-hyung retired.
On April 4, Defiant signed Jin "im37" Hong.
On May 21, Defiant promoted Daniel "Gods" Graeser and Normunds "sharyk" Faterins from Montreal Rebellion.
On May 29, Choi "Asher" Jun-sung retired.
On June 18, Defiant transferred Lee "envy" Kang-jae to Shanghai Dragons.
On June 28, Defiant promoted Andreas "Logix" Berghmans from Montreal Rebellion.
On June 28, Defiant signed Liam "Mangachu" Campbell.
On July 15, Defiant transferred Lee "Stellar" Do-hyung to Boston Uprising.

Standings

Record by stage

League

Game log

Regular season

References 

2019 Overwatch League seasons by team
Toronto Defiant
Toronto Defiant seasons